Little Beaver Creek may refer to the following creeks:

 Little Beaver Creek, a tributary of the Ohio River
 Little Beaver Creek (Missouri)
 Little Beaver Creek (Fisher River tributary), a stream in Surry County, North Carolina

 Little Beaver Creek (Lorain County, Ohio)